Davide Mastrantonio (born 16 January 2004) is an Italian professional footballer who plays as a goalkeeper for  club Triestina, on loan from Roma.

Club career 

Born in Rome, Mastrantonio started playing football at Urbetevere, before joining Roma's youth sector in 2017, aged 13. He subsequently came through the club's youth ranks, winning national titles at under-15 (in 2019) and under-17 levels (in 2020), before reaching the final of the under-19 championship in 2022. After signing his first professional contract with Roma in July 2021, the following year Mastrantonio renewed his deal with the club until 2026.

On 13 July 2022, the goalkeeper was sent on a season-long loan to Serie C club Triestina. He then made his professional debut on 3 September, aged 18, as he started the league match against Pordenone, which ended in a 0-2 loss for his side.

International career 

Mastrantonio has represented Italy at youth international level, having played for the under-18 and under-19 national teams.

He was included in the under-18 squad that took part in the 2022 Mediterranean Games in Oran, Algeria, with the Azzurrini eventually winning the silver medal after losing 1–0 against France in the final match.

Style of play 

Mastrantonio has been described as a well-rounded goalkeeper with several key attributes, including reflexes, agility, handling and distribution. A vocal and focused leader of the defense, he has shown his ability both as a shot-stopper and a penalty saver.

Due to his characteristics, he has been compared to Wojciech Szczęsny and Manuel Neuer.

Career statistics

Club

References

External links 

 
 

2004 births
Living people
Footballers from Rome
Italian footballers
Italy youth international footballers
Association football goalkeepers
Serie C players
A.S. Roma players
U.S. Triestina Calcio 1918 players
Footballers from Lazio